Suton may refer to

 Suton, Norfolk, a hamlet in England
 Goran Suton (b. 1985), Croatian basketball player
 Josip Suton (b. 1988), Croatian futsal player

Croatian surnames